The 1996–97 Yemeni League is the 5th edition of top-level football in Yemen.  The season started in November 1996 and ended in June 1997.  Al Wahda Sana'a' won the title.

Teams
A total of twelve teams contested the league, including teen sides from the 1994–95 season and two promoted teams from the 1994–95 ??? league.  Al-Taliya Taizz and Al-Shurta Aden were relegated from 1994 to 1995 Yemeni League after finishing the season in the bottom two places of the league table.  1994–95 ??? League champions Al-Ittihad (Ibb) and runners-up Al Sha'ab Sana'a secured direct promotion to the Yemeni League.

Stadia and locations

League table

Season statistics

Top scorers

References

Yem
Yemeni League seasons
football
football